The following are the national records in athletics in Israel maintained by Israeli Athletic Association (IAA).

Outdoor

Key to tables:

+ = en route to a longer distance

h = hand timing

A = affected by altitude

Mx = mixed race

Wo = woman only race

OT = oversized track (> 200m in circumference)

Men

Women

Indoor

Men

Women

Notes

References
General
Israeli National Records - Men Outdoor  17 February 2019 updated
Israeli National Records - Women Outdoor  17 February 2019 updated
Israeli National Records - Men Indoor  12 February 2019 updated
Israeli National Records - Women Indoor  17 February 2019 updated
Specific

External links
 IAA web site

Israel
Records
Athletics
Athletics